Euljiro 4(sa)-ga Station is a station on the Seoul Subway Line 2 and Seoul Subway Line 5.

References 

Seoul Metropolitan Subway stations
Railway stations opened in 1983
Metro stations in Jung District, Seoul
1983 establishments in South Korea
20th-century architecture in South Korea